Landshuter Jugendbuchpreis is a Bavarian literary prize.

Winners

2009

Nominated titles 
 Michael Gerard Bauer: Nennt mich nicht Ismael! aus dem Englischen von Ute Mihr. Hanser, 2008, 
 Alina Bronsky: Scherbenpark. Kiepenheuer & Witsch, 2008, 
 Sophie Dahl: Die Spiele der Erwachsenen, aus dem Englischen von Maria Mill. Bloomsbury, 2008, 
 Sharon Dogar: Salzwassersommer. aus dem Englischen von Petra Koob-Pawis. Arena, 2008, 
 Thea Dorn: Mädchenmörder. Manhattan, 2008, 
 Uzodinma Iweala: Du sollst Bestie sein! aus dem Englischen von Marcus Ingendaay. Ammann, 2008, 
 Lise Knudsen: Die schwarzen Flügel. aus dem Norwegischen von Maike Dörries. Baumhaus, 2008, 
 Erlend Loe: Ich bring mich um die Ecke. aus dem Norwegischen von Hinrich Schmidt-Henkel. Kiepenheuer & Witsch, 2008, 
 Stephenie Meyer: Seelen. aus dem Amerikanischen von Katharina Diestelmeier. Carlsen, 2008, 
 Joyce Carol Oates: Nach dem Unglück schwang ich mich auf, breitete meine Flügel aus und flog davon. aus dem Amerikanischen von Birgitt Kollmann. Hanser, 2008, 
 Jodi Picoult: 19 Minuten. aus dem Amerikanischen von Ulrike Wasel und Klaus Timmermann. Piper, 2008, 
 Bethan Roberts: Stille Wasser. aus dem Englischen von Ulrike Becker. Kunstmann, 2008, 
 Gerd Schneider: Kafkas Puppe. Arena, 2008, 
 Oliver Storz: Die Freibadclique. Schirmer Graf, 2008, 
 Markus Zusak: Die Bücherdiebin. aus dem Englischen von Alexandra Ernst. cbj, 2008,

Winners
 Thea Dorn: Mädchenmörder. Manhattan, 2008, 
 Jodi Picoult: 19 Minuten. aus dem Amerikanischen von Ulrike Wasel und Klaus Timmermann. Piper, 2008, 
 Stephenie Meyer: Seelen. aus dem Amerikanischen von Katharina Diestelmeier. Carlsen, 2008,

2010

Nominated titles 
 Isabel Abedi: Lucian. Arena, 2009, 
 Sherman Alexie: Das absolut wahre Tagebuch eines Teilzeitindianers (Illustrationen von Ellen Forney), aus dem Amerikanischen von Gerald Jung und Katharina Orgaß. dtv, 2009, 
 Michael Gerard Bauer: Ismael und der Auftritt der Seekühe, aus dem Englischen von Ute Mihr. Hanser, 2009, 
 Kevin Brooks: Being, aus dem Englischen von Uwe-Michael Gutzschhahn. dtv, 2009, 
 Kevin Brooks: Black Rabbit Summer, aus dem Englischen von Uwe-Michael Gutzschhahn. dtv, 2009, 
 Rachel Cohn und David Levithan: Naomi & Ely, aus dem Amerikanischen von Bernadette Ott. cbj, 2009, 
 Suzanne Collins: Die Tribute von Panem – Tödliche Spiele, aus dem Amerikanischen von Peter Klöss und Sylke Hachmeister. Oetinger, 2009, 
 Georg Elterlein: Der Hungerkünstler. Picus, 2009, 
 Monika Feth: Der Schattengänger. cbt, 2009, 
 Kerstin Gier: Rubinrot – Liebe geht durch alle Zeiten. Arena, 2009, 
 Rawi Hage: Als ob es kein Morgen gäbe, aus dem Englischen von Gregor Hens. DuMont, 2009, 
 Glyn Maxwell: Das Mädchen, das sterben sollte, aus dem Englischen von Martina Tichy. Kunstmann, 2009, 
 Mary E. Pearson: Zweiunddieselbe, aus dem Amerikanischen von Gerald Jung und Katharina Orgaß. S. Fischer, 2009, 
 Jenny Valentine: Wer ist Violet Park?, aus dem Englischen von Klaus Fritz. dtv, 2009, 
 Stan van Elderen: Warum Charlie Wallace?, aus dem Niederländischen von Bettina Bach. Hanser, 2009,

Winners
 Suzanne Collins: Die Tribute von Panem – Tödliche Spiele, aus dem Amerikanischen von Peter Klöss und Sylke Hachmeister. Oetinger, 2009, 
 Isabel Abedi: Lucian. Arena, 2009, 
 Kerstin Gier: Rubinrot – Liebe geht durch alle Zeiten. Arena, 2009,

2011

Nominated titles 
 Daniel Bielenstein: FAQ – Keine Show ist härter als das Leben. Arena, 2010, 
 Patrick Carman: Skeleton Creek – Wenn das Böse erwacht (mit beiliegender CD), aus dem Amerikanischen von Gerold Anrich. cbj, 2010, 
 Kari Erhardt: Reise mit Kaktus. Carlsen, 2010, 
 Jon Ewo: Am Haken, aus dem Norwegischen von Christel Hildebrandt. dtv, 2010, 
 John Green / Maureen Johnson / Lauren Myracle: Tage wie diese, aus dem Amerikanischen von Barbara Abedi. Arena, 2010, 
 Stephenie Meyer: Bis(s) zum ersten Sonnestrahl, aus dem Amerikanischen von Katharina Diestelmeier. Carlsen, 2010, 
 Marie-Aude Murail: Über kurz oder lang, aus dem Französischen von Tobias Scheffel. S. Fischer, 2010, 
 Haruki Murakami: 1Q84, aus dem Japanischen von Ursula Gräfe. DuMont, 2010, 
 Thorsten Nesch: Joyride Ost. rororo, 2010, 
 Susan Beth Pfeffer: Die Welt, wie wir sie kannten, aus dem Englischen von Annette von der Weppen. Carlsen, 2010, 
 Maggie Stiefvater: Nach dem Sommer, aus dem Amerikanischen von Sandra Kuffinke und Jessica Komina. Script 5/Loewe, 2010, 
 Janne Teller: Nichts – was im Leben wichtig ist, aus dem Dänischen von Sigrid Engeler. Hanser, 2010, 
 Mark Walden: F.I.E.S. – Fachinstitut für extreme Schurkenerziehung, aus dem Englischen von Ilse Rothfuß. Sauerländer, 2010, 
 Rachel Ward: Numbers – Den Tod im Blick, aus dem Englischen von Uwe-Michael Gutzschhahn. Carlsen, 2010, 
 Jane Yolen: Dornrose – Die Geschichte meiner Großmutter, aus dem Amerikanischen von Ulrike Nolte. Bloomsbury, 2010,

Winners
 Maggie Stiefvater: Nach dem Sommer, aus dem Amerikanischen von Sandra Kuffinke und Jessica Komina. Script 5/Loewe, 2010, 
 Rachel Ward: Numbers – Den Tod im Blick, aus dem Englischen von Uwe-Michael Gutzschhahn. Carlsen, 2010, 
 Daniel Bielenstein: FAQ – Keine Show ist härter als das Leben. Arena, 2010, 

Literary awards of Bavaria